Donald O'Larey Estes (October 14, 1938 – September 6, 2004) was a professional American football player. He played guard in the American Football League (AFL) in five games for the San Diego Chargers in 1966. He was drafted by the Chargers in the fourth round of the 1963 AFL draft, and also by the St. Louis Cardinals of the National Football League (NFL) in the second round of the 1963 NFL draft. He attended Louisiana State University, where he played college football for the LSU Tigers football team. Estes was born in Tomball, Texas and attended Brookhaven High School in Brookhaven, Mississippi.

References

External links
 

1938 births
2004 deaths
San Diego Chargers players
Sportspeople from Harris County, Texas
LSU Tigers football players
Players of American football from Texas
American football guards
People from Tomball, Texas
American Football League players